Hindpool is an area and electoral ward of Barrow-in-Furness, Cumbria, England. It is bordered by Barrow Island, Central Barrow, Ormsgill, Parkside and the Walney Channel, the local population stood at 5,851 in 2011. The ward covers the entire western half of the town centre and includes Barrow's main shopping district. Other local landmarks include the Furness College Channelside campus, the Dock Museum and the Main Public Library. Hindpool is also home to two stadia - Barrow Raiders' Craven Park and Barrow A.F.C.'s Holker Street.

The ward itself will be combined with Barrow Island and Central wards in April 2023 following formation of the new Westmorland and Furness Local Authority and be named 'Old Barrow'.

History
The Hindpool Estate appears on an 1843 Ordnance Survey map of what was then the village of Barrow within the parish of Dalton-in-Furness. Hindpool was at the forefront of Barrow's growth during the late 19th and early 20th century with numerous industries located within the area, most notably the Iron and Steelworks.

Architecture
Barrow being a planned town has many fine buildings to show for it, Abbey Road in particular is lined by numerous listed buildings including the Barrow Main Public Library, the Duke of Edinburgh Hotel, Nan Tait Centre and Ramsden Hall. Almost all residential buildings in Hindpool are terraced housing, the population density of the area was 29.86 people per hectare in 2001 (three times Barrow average and eight times national population density average).

Demographics

Retail sector
The vast majority of Barrow's retail industry is located in Hindpool and not the central ward where Barrow Borough Council is seated. The primary shopping district in Hindpool and Barrow itself is Dalton Road and Portland Walk which are located in the south-eastern corner of the ward. Alongside Hindpool's traditional shopping streets are three retail parks, including Hindpool Retail Park, Hollywood Park and Walney Road Retail Park.

Transportation
Hindpool has a well established road network which includes the A590 Walney Road which runs from Ormsgill in the north to Barrow Island in the south. Barrow's principal road, Abbey Road also has a 0.4 mile stretch that runs through east-central Hindpool. Barrow-in-Furness railway station is also located in Hindpool and the Cumbrian Coast Line marks the border between the ward and Ormsgill.

See also
 Hindpool Retail Parks
 Barrow Hematite Steel Company
 Barrow Jute Works

References

External links
 ONS: Hindpool Ward All Statistics
 Cumbria County Council: Hindpool Ward Profile

Districts of Barrow-in-Furness
Furness
Wards of Barrow-in-Furness